British Rail Class D1/1 (formerly DY1) was a class of shunting losomotives commissioned by British Rail in England. It was a diesel locomotive in the pre-TOPS period built by the Hunslet Engine Company with a  Gardner 6L3 engine.

History
The design was specifically designed to work dockside tramways and was ordered by the Eastern Region of British Railways to carry out this work. Equipped with a  wheelbase, it could work the tight curves of East Anglian dock systems.

Early on in their lives, the locomotives were initially allocated to Ipswich Engine Shed and were fitted with cow-catchers for working the dockside tramway lines. As time passed and traffic levels declined at Ipswich, they were transferred away from Ipswich with D2950 being recorded at Great Yarmouth (which had a quayside tramway) and D2951 at Goole which had a dock system. D2950 and D2951 were both transferred from Ipswich to Goole in December 1966.

Withdrawn in 1967 as part of a purge on non standard shunters, D2951 and D2952 were scrapped in 1968. D2950 survived in industrial use at Llanelli (at Thyssen (Great Britain) Ltd.) and was marked for preservation in 1982, but was ultimately scrapped in 1983.

Models 
Class D1/1 is being made as a kit and a ready-to-run model in OO gauge by Silver Fox Models.

See also
List of British Rail classes

Notes

References

Further reading

D001.02
B locomotives
Railway locomotives introduced in 1954
Standard gauge locomotives of Great Britain
Scrapped locomotives